ChatNow is a mobile phone-like walkie-talkie developed by Hasbro's Tiger Electronics division for the preteen market. It includes simple digital photography and text message functionality and transmits using the Family Radio Service UHF radio band. It has limited compatibility with other FRS gear; in particular, it is not compatible with CTCSS or DCS signals commonly used on standard FRS gear.

ChatNow differs from standard walkie-talkies by having a 10-digit "Buddy number" (ex.0794020300), allowing users to communicate with specific other users in a telephone-like manner; to make text messaging easier, the ChatNow units provide limited buddy list capability. There is a limited digital camera built into the device as well, and the unit can store up to 30 black and white pictures.

The units are sold in pairs, and come in both flip phone and slide-out configurations. Hasbro also manufactures add-ons and carrying cases for the line.

See also
Family Radio Service
VideoNow, VCamNow, and TVNow, related Hasbro products

References

External links
Tiger Electronics Official ChatNow Website

Electronic toys
2000s toys
Hasbro products